Sing as You Swing is a 1937 British musical film directed by Redd Davis and starring Charles Clapham, Bill Dwyer and Claude Dampier. It was made as a quota quickie and features turns from a variety of radio and revue stars with little background narrative.

The film's sets were designed by the art director George Provis. It was shot at Joe Rock's Elstree Studios.

Cast
 Charles Clapham as himself 
 Bill Dwyer as himself 
 Claude Dampier as Pomphrey Featherstone-Chaw 
 Billie Carlyle as Telephone Operator 
 The Mills Brothers as Themselves 
 Evelyn Dall as Cora Fane 
 Mantovani as himself 
 Lu Ann Meredith as Sally Bevan 
 Brian Lawrance as Jimmy King 
 Carol Chilton as herself 
 Maceo Thomas as himself
 Nat Gonella and His Georgians as Themselves 
 Beryl Orde as herself 
 H. F. Maltby as Drake 
 Edward Ashley as Harrington 
 Rio & Santos as Themselves
 Jimmy Godden
 Eric Maturin
 The Sherman Fisher Girls as Themselves

References

Bibliography
 Chibnall, Steve. Quota Quickies: The Birth of the British 'B' Film (British Film Institute, 2007)
 Low, Rachael. Filmmaking in 1930s Britain (George Allen & Unwin, 1985)
 Wood, Linda. British Films, 1927-1939 (British Film Institute, 1986)

External links

1937 films
British comedy films
British black-and-white films
1937 comedy films
Films directed by Redd Davis
Films shot at Rock Studios
Quota quickies
1930s English-language films
1930s British films